The Annual Review of Criminology is a peer-reviewed academic journal published by Annual Reviews. It was established in 2018 and covers the field of criminology. Its founding co-editors were Joan Petersilia and Robert J. Sampson. , the co-editors are Tracey L. Meares and Sampson. As of 2022, Journal Citation Reports gives the journal  an impact factor of 6.026, ranking it fourth of 69 journal titles in the category Criminology & Penology.

Abstracting and indexing
The journal is abstracted and indexed in Scopus and Social Sciences Citation Index.

References

External links

 

Criminology
Annual journals
Publications established in 2018
English-language journals
Criminology journals